Urmston railway station is a railway station serving the town of Urmston in Greater Manchester, England. It is managed by Northern Trains.

History
The station was opened by the Cheshire Lines Committee on 2 September 1873.

Facilities

A new building on the Manchester-bound platform houses the ticket office and a waiting room. The main station building on the Liverpool-bound platform was disused for many years in the 1990s, but was re-opened as a pub/restaurant in June 2008. The station is staffed part-time (06:15 to 12:45 weekdays, 07:00 to 13:30 Saturdays, closed Sundays) - outside these times, tickets must be bought in advance or on the train.  Train running details are provided by telephone, automated announcements and timetable posters.  Step-free access is available to both platforms.

Services

Services run half-hourly in both directions towards  and Liverpool Lime Street to the west and towards Humphrey Park and Manchester Oxford Road in the east. Services run hourly in the evening (certain westbound trains terminate at Warrington) and on Sundays.

References

External links

Railway stations in Trafford
DfT Category E stations
Former Cheshire Lines Committee stations
Railway stations in Great Britain opened in 1873
Northern franchise railway stations
1873 establishments in England
Railway stations served by TransPennine Express